China Iron and Steel Association (CISA) is a national, non-profit organization founded in 1999 on the basis of China Metallurgical Enterprise Management Association. CISA members consist of China’s steel enterprises, institutions, societies and individuals in the iron and steel industry, which participate the organization voluntarily according to certain regulations. CISA now has over 119 group members. CISA is made up of 7 administrative bodies with 30 staff and 7 working committees.

CISA’s responsibility is to link Chinese iron & steel industry with the government, to provide “two-way services” to Chinese steelmakers and institutions, as well as to explore cooperation opportunities with overseas companies and organizations.

References

External links
 
 www.chinaesteel.com

Trade associations based in China
Steel industry of China